Jasper is a city in Newton County, Arkansas, United States. According to the 2020 census, its population is 547. The city is the county seat of Newton County.

Jasper is part of the Harrison Micropolitan Statistical Area.

Geography
Jasper is located at  (36.008558, -93.185660).

Major highway
 Highway 7

Demographics

2020 census

As of the 2020 United States census, there were 547 people, 240 households, and 137 families residing in the city.

2000 census
At the 2000 census there were 498 people in 231 households, including 115 families, in the city. The racial makeup of the city was 99.98% White, 0.01% Native American, 0.01% from other races, and 0.00% from two or more races.  0.00% of the population were Hispanic or Latino of any race.
Of the 233 households 24.8% had children under the age of 18 living with them, 32.5% were married couples living together, 15.2% had a female householder with no husband present, and 49.8% were non-families. 48.5% of households were one person and 27.8% were one person aged 65 or older.  The average household size was 1.95 and the average family size was 2.82.

The age distribution was 21.3% under the age of 18, 6.4% from 18 to 24, 18.7% from 25 to 44, 22.5% from 45 to 64, and 31.1% 65 or older.  The median age was 49 years. For every 100 females, there were 71.7 males.  For every 100 females age 18 and over, there were 63.7 males.

The median household income was $13,556 and the median family income  was $26,668. Males had a median income of $21,458 versus $16,786 for females. The per capita income for the city was $13,557.  About 25.9% of families and 31.6% of the population were below the poverty line, including 47.6% of those under age 18 and 25.4% of those age 65 or over.

Education 
Jasper is headquarters for the Jasper School District, which is geographically one of the state's largest and serves portions of five counties. Jasper School District includes the Jasper Elementary School and Jasper High School.

Economy

See also 
 Gould Jones Reservoir

References

External links
 Map of Jasper (US Census Bureau)
 City of Jasper
 Jasper School District
 Newton County Times
 Newton County Historical Society
 Jasper/Newton County Chamber of Commerce
 Jasper entry in the Encyclopedia of Arkansas

Cities in Newton County, Arkansas
Cities in Arkansas
County seats in Arkansas
Harrison, Arkansas micropolitan area